Sabrina Fortune (born 25 May 1997) is a British Paralympic track and field athlete from Wales competing in category F20 throwing events. Fortune won a bronze medal at the 2016 Summer Paralympics in the shot put and a gold medal at the 2019 World Para Athletics Championships, also in shot put.

History
Fortune, who comes from Bryn-y-baal, Mold in north Wales, has speech dyspraxia which makes communication difficult for her. Her condition resulted in a mild intellectual impairment. After leaving school she studied hospitality management at Coleg Cambria in Wrexham.

Athletics career
Fortune became inspired to take up athletics after watching her brother compete. She joined a club at the age of eleven in 2008 and began competing at local meets. In 2014, she travelled to São Paulo to take part in the Brazilian Paralympic School Games, winning gold in the F20 shot put. That year she also took part in her first IPC Grand Prix, in Grosseto, Italy. The following year Fortune was selected for the Great Britain team to compete at the 2015 IPC Athletics World Championships in Doha, entering the shot put event. Her throw of 12.14 m saw her finish just outside the medal positions in fourth place.

In 2016, in the buildup the Rio Paralympics, Fortune travelled back to Grosseto, this time to compete in the 2016 IPC Athletics European Championships. A distance of 12.14 m saw her again finish fourth in the shot put. Fortune's results saw her selected for Team GB at the 2016 Summer Paralympics, competing in the shot put. She competed in the final on 10 September throwing a personal best of 12.94 m to win the bronze medal, becoming the first Welsh athlete of the games to reach the podium.

Fortune won the gold medal in shot put F20 at 2018 World Para Athletics European Championships in Berlin, with a championship-record throw of 13.30 m.
Fortune won the gold medal in shot put F20 at 2019 World Para Athletics Championships in Dubai, with a championship-record throw of 13.91 m.

In June 2021 she was among the first dozen athletes chosen for the UK athletics teams at the postponed 2020 Paralympics in Tokyo. She came fifth in the 2020 Paralympic F20 Shot Put, with a distance of 13.56 m.

References

1997 births
Living people
Athletes (track and field) at the 2016 Summer Paralympics
Athletes (track and field) at the 2020 Summer Paralympics
Track and field athletes with disabilities
Medalists at the 2016 Summer Paralympics
Paralympic athletes of Great Britain
Paralympic bronze medalists for Great Britain
Paralympic medalists in athletics (track and field)
Sportspeople from Wrexham
Sportswomen with disabilities
Welsh female discus throwers
Welsh female shot putters
Welsh Paralympic competitors